Scott Andrew Kindsvater is a retired United States Air Force lieutenant general who last served as the 22nd Deputy Chair of the NATO Military Committee. He assists the Chair's role as principal adviser to the NATO Secretary General and senior military spokesman of the 30-nation alliance. He also advises the Deputy Secretary General, leads coordination of nuclear, biological and chemical matters and, in the Chair's absence, directs daily operations and the business of the Military Committee, NATO's highest military authority.  Previously, he was the deputy chief of staff for operations and intelligence of the Supreme Headquarters Allied Powers Europe.

He is retired from active duty as of October 1, 2021.

Awards and decorations

Effective dates of promotions

References

Notes
1.The official biography claims an impossible date "June 31, 1991." May 31 follows with Air Force tradition to promote second & first lieutenants exactly every two years.

Living people
Place of birth missing (living people)
Recipients of the Defense Superior Service Medal
Recipients of the Legion of Merit
United States Air Force generals
United States Air Force personnel of the Gulf War
United States Air Force personnel of the Iraq War
Year of birth missing (living people)